Something Big is the fifth album by Mick Fleetwood, released 28 September 2004. The album features a number of guest musicians, including Fleetwood Mac's John McVie, Jeremy Spencer a member of the original Fleetwood Mac, and singer-songwriter Jackson Browne.

As of February 2005, the album has sold over 3,000 copies in the U.S. Like many Mick Fleetwood albums, it has been released several times. It is so far the only Mick Fleetwood album to be credited to "The Mick Fleetwood Band".

Track listing
All tracks written by Todd Smallwood, except where noted:

"Bitter End"
"Something Big"
"Where the Wind Blows"
"It's Only Money"
"Walking with the Angels" 
"Making Other Plans"
"These Walls" 
"Looking into You" (Jackson Browne) 
"Passion" (Mick Fleetwood, Smallwood)
"No Borders" (Carlos Santana, Smallwood)
"Watching Over You"
"Heaven Sent"

Personnel
Mick Fleetwood – vocals, bells, drums, percussion, tambourine, talking drum
Todd Smallwood – vocals, guitar, bass guitar, dobro, Hammond B3, harp, keyboards, mandolin, shaker, piano
Jackson Browne – vocals
Lauren Evans – vocals
Alan Simon – acoustic guitar
Jeremy Spencer – guitar
Matt Andes – slide guitar
John McVie – bass guitar
Chris Golden – bass guitar
Andro Kotula – bass guitar
Oleg Schramm – Hammond organ, piano
Karen Goulding – viola
Guenevere Measham – cello
Julie Rogers – violin
Oliver Brown – congas
Steve Shehan – percussion
Jim Christie – percussion
April Hendrix-Haberlan	– backing vocals
Sidney Iverson	– backing vocals

Production
 Mick Fleetwood – executive producer, producer
 Jonathan Todd	 – executive producer
 Todd Smallwood – producer, engineer
 Engineered by Jackson Brown – engineer
 Todd Smallwood – engineer
 Alan Simon – engineer
 Oleg Schramm – engineer
 Phillips Nichols – engineer
 Mark Needham – engineer
 Bill Lane – engineer
 Randy Kizer – engineer

References

External links
Something Big at AllMusic

Mick Fleetwood albums
2004 albums
Albums produced by Mick Fleetwood